The  is the name of an aerial lift, as well as its operator. The line climbs Mount Hakodate in Hakodate, Japan. As of 2004, this is the most heavily used aerial lift line in Japan, transporting 1,559,000 riders yearly.  The aerial tramway was prominently featured in Noein, a 2005 anime.

Basic data
System: Aerial tramway, 2 track cables and 1 haulage rope
Distance: 
Vertical interval: 
Maximum gradient: 28°
Operational speed: 7 m/s
Passenger capacity: 125

History
1958:  opened the aerial tramway line of 31 passenger capacity.
1959: For the benefit of tourists, the company opened an observation deck, a restaurant and a souvenir shop at the summit.
1965: The operator started taxi business.
1970: The gondolas were modified to allow 45 passenger capacity.
1975: The company's taxi division was spun off into a separate company.
1976: Hakodate Tour System changed its name to Mt. Hakodate Ropeway Corporation.
1978: The company opened a cafe restaurant called Motomachi Ichibankan near Sanroku Station.
1986: The operator became the third sector company. The line and the observation deck were modified.
1992: The company opened FM Iruka, the first community FM radio station in Japan.
1993: Cafe Pelra opened.
1997: New gondolas were imported from Austria.

Services
Cabins operate once every 10 minutes. The whole ride takes 3 minutes. The adult fare costs ¥1,000 one-way, or ¥1,500 for a round-trip.

Stations

See also
List of aerial lifts in Japan

External links

 Mt. Hakodate Ropeway official website
 Mt. Hakodate Ropeway official website
 FM Iruka official website

Aerial tramways in Japan
1958 establishments in Japan